Bolton East was a borough constituency in the town of Bolton in Greater Manchester (formerly in Lancashire). It returned one Member of Parliament (MP) to the House of Commons of the Parliament of the United Kingdom.

The constituency was created for the 1950 general election.  It was abolished in boundary changes for the 1983 general election, when most of Bolton East became part of the new constituency of Bolton South East.

Boundaries

The County Borough of Bolton wards of Astley Bridge, Bradford, Church, Darcy Lever-cum-Breightmet, East, Great Lever, Hulton, North, and Tonge.

Members of Parliament

Election results

Elections in the 1950s

Elections in the 1960s

Elections in the 1970s

See also 
 List of parliamentary constituencies in Greater Manchester

References

Politics of the Metropolitan Borough of Bolton
Parliamentary constituencies in North West England (historic)
Constituencies of the Parliament of the United Kingdom established in 1950
Constituencies of the Parliament of the United Kingdom disestablished in 1983